The 40th edition of the annual Clásico RCN was held from August 11 to August 20, 2000 in Colombia. The stage race with an UCI rate of 2.4 started in Medellín and finished in Bogotá. RCN stands for "Radio Cadena Nacional" one of the oldest and largest radio networks in the nation.

Stages

2000-08-11: Medellín — Pueblito Paisa (5.4 km)

2000-08-12: Medellín — Jardín (172 km)

2000-08-13: Jardín — Manizales (210 km)

2000-08-14: Manizales — Cartago (207 km)

2000-08-15: Roldanillo — Cali (131 km)

2000-08-16: Palmira — Pereira (182 km)

2000-08-17: Pereira — Ibagué (126 km)

2000-08-18: Ibagué — Madrid (188 km)

2000-08-19: Circuito Parque Nacional, Bogotá (102 km)

2000-08-20: Plaza de Bolívar — Patios, Bogotá (18.5 km)

Final classification

Teams 

05 Orbitel

Lotería de Boyacá

Aguardiente Antioqueño—Lotería de Medellín

Aguardiente Néctar—Café Águila Roja

Aguardiente Cristal—Chec

Cuba de Aviación

Club Ciclo Guachucal Nariño

Ron Boyacá—Covarachía—Dosmopar

Santa Fe Ron Añejo ELC

Mixto Antioquia

Mixto Cauca—Cicloases

Kazakhstan—Mixto Boyacá

See also 
 2000 Vuelta a Colombia

References 

Clásico RCN
Clasico RCN
Clasico RCN